The 2004 Italy Rugby Union Tour of Romania and Japan was a series of matches played during 2004 in Romania and Japan by the Italian national rugby union team.

Results

Romania: 15.Dan Dumbrava, 14.Vasile Ghioc, 13.Cristian Sauan, 12.Romeo Gontineac, 11.Bogdan Voicu, 10.Ionut Tofan, 9.Lucian Sirbu, 8.Alin Petrache(capt.), 7.Ovidiu Tonita, 6.Costica Mersoiu, 5.Cristian Petre, 4.Cornel Tatu, 3.Marcel Socaciu, 2.Bogdan Zebega Suman, 1.Petru Balan,  – replacements: 16.Paulica Ion, 17.Petrisor Toderasc, 18.Valentin Ursache, 19.Marius Bejan, 20.Iulian Andrei, 21.Stefan Dumitru, 22.Ionut Dimofte 
Italy: 15.Gonzalo Canale, 14.Nicola Mazzucato, 13.Andrea Masi, 12.Walter Pozzebon, 11.Kaine Robertson, 10.Francesco Mazzariol, 9.Alessandro Troncon (capt), 8.Andrea de Rossi, 7.Aaron Persico, 6.Enrico Pavanello, 5.Carlo Del Fava, 4.Marco Bortolami, 3.Salvatore Costanzo, 2.Fabio Ongaro, 1.Andrea Lo Cicero,  – replacements: 16.Giorgio Intoppa, 17.Mario Savi, 18.Roberto Mandelli, 19.Scott Palmer, 20.Paul Griffen, 21.Danilo Carpente, 22.Matteo Barbini 

Japan: 15.Kosuke Endo, 14.Takafumi Hirao, 13.Daisuke Ohata, 12.Yukio Motoki, 11.Hirotoki Onozawa, 10.Kyohei Morita, 9.Wataru Ikeda, 8.Takeomi Ito, 7.Takuro Miuchi (capt), 6.Feletikiki Mau, 5.Takanori Kumagae, 4.Adam Parker, 3.Ryo Yamamura, 2.Yuji Matsubara, 1.Yuichi Hisadomi,  – replacements: 16.Takashi Yamaoka, 18.Lautangi Vatuvei, 19.Koichi Kubo, 21.Masatoshi Mukoyama, 22.Keiji Takei     –  No entry : 17.Yasumasa Miyamoto, 20.Mamoru Ito
Italy: 15.Gonzalo Canale, 14.Kaine Robertson, 13.Andrea Masi, 12.Matteo Barbini, 11.Walter Pozzebon, 10.Rima Wakarua, 9.Paul Griffen, 8.David dal Maso, 7.Mauro Bergamasco, 6.Enrico Pavanello, 5.Marco Bortolami (capt.), 4.Carlo Del Fava, 3.Martin Castrogiovanni, 2.Fabio Ongaro, 1.Andrea Lo Cicero,  – replacements: 16.Giorgio Intoppa, 17.Mario Savi, 18.Roberto Mandelli, 19.Aaron Persico, 20.Alessandro Troncon, 21.Danilo Carpente, 22.Nicola Mazzucato 

Italy
tour
Italy national rugby union team tours
Rugby union tour
Rugby union tour
Rugby union tours of Romania
Rugby union tours of Japan